The cornettino (plural cornettini) is the descant instrument of the cornetto family. Cornettini usually have a primary scale of C or D major, with middle C or the adjacent D the pedal note of the instrument. The regular cornett is the 'treble' instrument of the family.

Construction 

Like the cornetto, the cornettino was originally made from two pieces of wood, carved out and glued together. The instrument was covered in leather or parchment to prevent leaks and improve the grip for the player. Some instruments were made from ivory and these instruments were, accordingly, not covered in leather. The mouthpieces were made from animal horn, bone or ivory. Some instruments featured metal mountings at one or both ends of the instrument; these mountings help prevent the fraying of the leather or parchment and were decorative. Silver and gold were used for these mountings. Some modern instruments are made from a plastic such as ABS resin.

History 

Cornettini were common in the high Renaissance and the Baroque musical periods. They were featured extensively in Northern European music and ignored almost entirely by Southern European composers, except those who migrated north. In the time of Michael Praetorius, the cornettino seems to have sometimes been used in sacred vocal music to play in unison with voices (especially tenors) an octave higher. Later in the 17th century, Northern European composers frequently used cornettini in large scale Masses, cantatas and other sacred music. The cornettino was favoured by the Stadtpfeiffen and composers like Johann Caspar Horn and Matthias Spiegler wrote a significant quantity of consort music featuring one to three cornettini. It appears that the cornettino continued to be used, primarily in church music and in Stadtpfeiffer bands, in some places in Europe until the late 18th century. Georg Philipp Telemann and Johann Sebastian Bach used the cornettino in several church cantatas.

Tessitura 

The tessitura or compass/range of the cornettino is c' (C4) to around g" (G6)'. A player with a strong embouchure may be able to coax higher notes from this instrument. (C4 is middle C.)

Pitch 

Almost all surviving specimens of this instrument are pitched circa a' = 466 Hz or higher. Like organs, cornetts and trombones, the cornettino was regarded as primarily an ecclesiastical instrument and hence was constructed in Chor-ton (choir pitch) or Kornett-ton pitch. Pitch standards at the time varied widely.

Timbre 

The timbre of the cornettino is more pungent, brighter and a little more incisive than that of the regular cornetto. Cornettini were frequently used in large consorts and orchestras in the company of trumpets and high violin parts. The timbre of the instrument seems to have been regarded by 17th century Northern European composers as very agreeable juxtaposed the natural trumpets of the time which featured a conical bell and a much more "oboe-like" sound and the violins pitched at a' = 466 Hz. The second and third octaves of the cornettino can be made to sound piercing. The primary/fundamental octave has an agreeable "reedy" quality, which is reminiscent of the later oboe.

Variants 

A small number (three: one in Nuremberg; two in Vienna) of mute cornettini (id est descant mute cornetti) have survived and these instruments are straight, like their treble and alto counterparts, with an integral mouthpiece. No extant music for the mute cornettino has yet come to light and the function of this instrument remains obscure. The surviving score of the large scale madrigal, Udite chiari e generosi figli à 16 voci, by Giovanni Gabrieli, requires a cornetto muto on the cantus line of Choro I. Since this part requires the instrument to play up to a", a mute cornettino may have been intended by the composer - certainly this part would be readily playable on such an instrument, although, the tessitura of the part is well within the compass of a regular mute cornett in G or F.

Repertoire 

Some composers who specified the use of the cornettino in their scores include: Michael Praetorius, Heinrich Schütz, Johann Heinrich Schmelzer, Heinrich Ignaz Franz von Biber, Matthias Weckmann, Antonio Bertali, Johann Caspar Horn, Johann Erasmus Kindermann, Matthias Spiegler, Johann Vierdanck, Johann Sebastian Bach and Georg Philipp Telemann.

A small selection of extant works featuring the cornettino:

 Antonio Bertali Sonata Sancti Leopoldi à 14: 2 Violini, 2 Cornettini, 2 Clarini, 3 Violettae, Cornetto muto, 4 Tromboni, Organo.
 Kaspar Förster Sonata a. 7. instrom: 2 Violini, 2 Cornettini, Viola da braccio, Fagotto, Violone, Basso continuo.
 Johann Heinrich Schmelzer 
 Johann Heinrich Schmelzer Sonata XII a sette: 2 Cornettini, 2 Trombettae, 3 Tromboni, Organo.
 Matthias Spiegler Canzon à 2: Cornettino, Fagotto, Organo.
 Matthias Spiegler Canzon à 3: 2 Violini ô 2 Cornettini, Fagotto, Organo.
 Matthias Spiegler Capriccio à 3: 2 Cornettini, Fagotto, Organo.
 Giovanni Valentini Sonata à 4: Violino, Cornettino, Trombone, Fagotto, Organo.
 Matthias Weckmann Sonata à 4[10 sonatas with same scoring]: Cornettino, Violino, Trombone ["o Viola da braccio" in one sonata], Fagotto ["o Bombard" in several], Basso continuo.
 Crato Bütner Deus in adjiutorium meum intende à 7, 12: SSATB in concerto, SSATB in ripieno [composer suggests the ripieni may be replaced by 2 Cornetti & 3 Tromboni), 2 Violini, 2 Cornettini, 2 Viole, Viola basso, Bombard grosso.
 Crato Bütner Siehe, es hat überwunden à 14,18: SSATTB in concerto, SATB in ripieno, 2 Violini, 2 Cornettini, 2 Trombettae, 3 Tromboni, Viola basso, Bombard grosso.
 Samuel Friedrich Capricornus Der Herr ist mein Hirte: SSATTB, 2 Cornettini, 2 Violini, 4 Tromboni o 3 Viole e Fagotto, Basso continuo.
 Maurizio Cazzati Deus in Adjutorium meum intende à 7 vel 12: Choir I SATTB; Choir II SATTB ripieno, doubled by Cornetto, 4 Tromboni; 2 Violini, 2 Cornettini, Basso viola, Bombard basso, Fagotto, Organo. 
 Johann Melchior Gletle Expeditionis musicae classis II ... Op. II, 1668 39 Psalmi Breves All scored thus: SSATB concertato, SSATB in cappella, 2 Violini o 2 Cornettini, 2 Violae o 2 Tromboni, Fagotto o Trombone, Violone, Organo.
 Andreas Hammerschmidt Freue dich, du Tochter Zion à 6: SSTB 2 Cornettini, Basso continuo.
 Andreas Hammerschmidt O, ihr lieben Hirten à 6: SATB, 2 Cornettini, Basso continuo.
 Andreas Hammerschmidt Was meinestu, wil aus dem Kindlein werden à 5: ATB, 2 Cornettini, Basso continuo.
 Andreas Hammerschmidt Gelobet sey der Herr à 4: AB, 2 Cornettini, Basso continuo.
 Andreas Hammerschmidt Warlich ich sage euch à 7: SSSTB, 2 Cornettini, Basso continuo.
 Johann Caspar Horn Lasst uns aus spatzieren fahren: SS, 2 Cornettini, 2 Voilae, Fagotto, Basso continuo.
 Sebastian Knüpfer Herr, ich habe lieb die Städte deines Hauses: ATB, 2 Cornettini, Trombone, Basso continuo.
 Sebastian Knüpfer Ich Habe dich zum Licht der Heiden gemacht à 16: SATTB in concerto, SATTB in cappella, 2 Violini, 3 Viole, 2 Cornettini, 3 Tromboni, Fagotto, Organo.
 Sebastian Knüpfer Jauchzet dem Herrn alle Welt à 17: SATB, SATB, SATB in ripieno, 2 Violini, 3 Viole, 2 Trombettae, 2 Cornettini, Cornetto, 2 Tromboni, Fagotto, Organo.
 Sebastian Knüpfer O benignissime Jesu à 6, 10: ATB concertato, SATB ripieno, 2 Violini o 2 Cornettini, Viola da Gamba o Bombard o Trombone, Organo.
 Sebastian Knüpfer Super flumina Babylonis à 10, 15, 19: SATB in concerto, SATB in cappella, 2 Violini, 3 Viole, 2 Cornettini, 3 Tromboni, Fagotto, Organo, Basso continuo.
 Sebastian Knüpfer Surgite, populi à 26, 34: SATB in concerto, SATB in cappella, SATB in concerto, SATB in cappella, 5 Trombettae, Timpani, 2 Cornettini, Cornetto muto, 3 Tromboni, 2 Violini, 3 Violae, Fagotto, Organo.
 Sebastian Knüpfer Veni Sancte Spiritus à 20, 25, o 30: SSATB in concerto, SSATB in ripieno, 4 Trombettae, Timpani, 2 Cornettini, 3 Tromboni, 2 Violini, 2 Violae, Fagotto, 5 unspecified instruments ripieno, Basso continuo.
 Sebastian Knüpfer Christ lag in Todesbanden à 19: SSATB in concerto, SSATB in cappella, Cornettino, 3 Bombarden, Violino piccolo, Violino, 3 Violae, Basso continuo.
 Johann Albrecht Kress In te Domine speravi: Alto, Cornettino, Basso continuo.

Works by Heinrich Ignaz Franz von Biber and Andreas Hofer specify the cornetto in a number of sacred compositions, but one may presume that such parts were intended to be played on cornettini on account of the tessitura of such parts. The Missa Salisburgensis à 53 voci is an example.

Nomenclature 

The cornettino was also known as: Cornettin [Cornettinen], Kornettin, Quart-Zink, Klein Discant Zink, Klein Diskant Zink, Diskant Zink, Krummer Diskant Zink and corñio (as in Bach's chorale cantata Christum wir sollen loben schon, BWV 121). The accepted English plurals of "cornettino" are "cornettini" and "cornettinos".

See also 

 Cornett
 Tenor cornett
 Mute Cornett
 Alto Cornett
 Bass Cornett
 Sackbut

References 

A Catalogue of Music for the Cornett by Bruce Dickey and Michael Collver; Indiana University Press 1996 
Woodwind Instruments and their History by Anthony Baines, Faber and Faber Limited © Anthony Baines Third Edition, 1967

Brass instruments
Early musical instruments
C instruments
D instruments